Bolshoy Log is a rural locality (a village) in Oktyabrsky Selsoviet, Blagoveshchensky District, Bashkortostan, Russia. The population was 10 as of 2010. There is 1 street.

Geography 
Bolshoy Log is located 75 km northeast of Blagoveshchensk (the district's administrative centre) by road. Mukhametdinovo is the nearest rural locality.

References 

Rural localities in Blagoveshchensky District